Camboriú is a municipality in the state of Santa Catarina in the South region of Brazil, near Balneario Camboriu, a popular beach destination.

Toponym 
The toponym "Camboriú" is a reference to the Camboriú River. It's a name with origin in the Tupi language which means "river of the common snook", through kamuri (snook) and 'y (river). Another hypothesis is that the indigenous origin inspires itselve in the relief of the Pedra Branca, a hill that resembles a female breast and is visible through several points in the municipality. According to Patrianova, in his book called "Pequeno Livro", Cambu, means "to nurse" and Ryry, Ruru, Riú (which are all the same), meaning nursing container, that is, breast.

See also
List of municipalities in Santa Catarina

References

Municipalities in Santa Catarina (state)